Nikon's Ohi plant in the Ōi district of Shinagawa, Tokyo was first built in 1918 after the formation of Nippon Kogaku K.K. in 1917. Nikon's first camera, the Nikon (1946) was made in this plant. Early cameras like the Nikon I (1948), Nikon M (1949), Nikon S rangefinders and Nikon F,F2 were also made in this plant. The development of specialized cameras for NASA's space program was also carried out at the Ohi plant.

References

External links
Nikon, Corporate Info, Ohi Plant

Buildings and structures in Tokyo
Shinagawa
Manufacturing plants in Japan
Nikon
Industrial buildings completed in 1918
1918 establishments in Japan